Charles W. Roberts (September 7, 1907 – September 10, 1984), nicknamed "Specs", was an American Negro league pitcher who played in the 1930s and 1940s. 

A native of High Point, North Carolina, Roberts made his Negro leagues debut in 1936 with the Bacharach Giants. He went on to play for several teams, including the Homestead Grays and New York Black Yankees, and finished his career in 1945 with the Newark Eagles. Roberts died in Fort Worth, Texas in 1984 at age 77.

References

External links
 and Baseball-Reference Black Baseball stats and Seamheads

1907 births
1984 deaths
Bacharach Giants players
Homestead Grays players
Indianapolis Clowns players
New York Black Yankees players
Newark Eagles players
Philadelphia Stars players
Washington Black Senators players
Baseball pitchers
Baseball players from Ohio